Governor Armitage may refer to:

Cecil Hamilton Armitage (1869–1933), Governor of the Gambia from 1921 to 1927
Robert Perceval Armitage (1906–1990), Governor of Cyprus from 1954 to 1955 and Governor of Nyasaland from 1956 to 1961